Britt-Marie Lindkvist, born 1941, is a Swedish social democratic politician. She was a member of the Riksdag from 1998 to 2006.

External links
Britt-Marie Lindkvist at the Riksdag website

Members of the Riksdag from the Social Democrats
Living people
1941 births
Women members of the Riksdag
Members of the Riksdag 2002–2006
21st-century Swedish women politicians